A Son Unique is the third and final studio album by Ol' Dirty Bastard. It was supposed to be released after ODB's death in 2004 but was eventually shelved. It was meant to be distributed by label owner Damon Dash. However, ODB was posthumously dropped from Roc-A-Fella Records, and the album has never been released. Despite this, it has been available as a digital download and promo CDs had been circulating on the resale market.

Background
On the day of its planned release, A Son Unique was made available on iTunes. The release was eventually cancelled by ODB's label, Roc-A-Fella. The album was finally going to be released in November 2009 to commemorate the fifth anniversary of ODB's death, but eventually got delayed again. As of 2020, A Son Unique has never been physically released, but available on digital music distribution services.

Before releasing A Son Unique, ODB changed his stage name from Ol' Dirty Bastard to Dirt McGirt. The working title for the album was Dirt McGirt.

Track listing

References

External links
 ODB lives on!
 Damon Dash Music Group
 MTV announces release date

Ol' Dirty Bastard albums
2005 albums
Albums produced by Pharrell Williams
Albums produced by DJ Premier
Albums produced by Mark Ronson
Albums produced by RZA
Albums produced by Rockwilder
Albums produced by Dame Grease